This is a partial list of unsolved murders in Australia.

List

See also 
:Category:Unsolved deaths in Australia

References

 
Australian crime-related lists